Chaumont station is a historic railway station located at Chaumont in Jefferson County, New York. It was built in about 1900 and is a one-story, one by six bay frame building on a low foundation of coursed limestone.  It was built to serve the Cape Vincent Branch of the New York Central Railroad.  It was last used as a railway station in 1952.

It was listed on the National Register of Historic Places in 1990 as the Chaumont Railroad Station.

References

Railway stations on the National Register of Historic Places in New York (state)
Railway stations in the United States opened in 1900
Railway stations closed in 1952
Former New York Central Railroad stations
Transportation buildings and structures in Jefferson County, New York
National Register of Historic Places in Jefferson County, New York
Former railway stations in New York (state)